The 2012 Lone Star Conference football began on August 30 when West Texas A&M lost to CSU-Pueblo and ended with West Texas A&M loss against Winston-Salem in the NCAA D2 Semi Final on December 8. It was Abilene Christian and Incarnated Word last season before they moved to NCAA D1 Southland Conference.

Stadiums

Preseason
Abilene Christian's Mitchell Gale was chosen preseason Offensive Player of the Year and Texas A&M-Kingsville's Jeremy Aguilar preseason Defensive Player of the Year.

Coaching changes
In January Tarleton promoted Justin Carrigan to offensive coordinator. Pierce Holt, two-time NFL All-Pro selection, two-time All-American and a member of the College Football Hall of Fame, was hired by Angelo State as an assistant football coach and Drew Dallas was hired as promoted from GA to recruiting coordinator and offensive assistant in March.
Theron Aych was hired as offensive coordinator for Angelo State Russell Gaskamp who left to take over Oklahoma Panhandle State University while Jay Eilers was hired as offensive line coach and Gary Salgado as a defensive ends coach and be the special teams coordinator.

Preseason votes

Preseason All American

Watch List

Texas A&M-Kingsville junior place kicker Matt Stoll on the Mitchell Award Watch List.

Transfers

Several players transferred to schools in the Lone Star Conference

Regular season

All times Central time.  LSC teams in bold.

Week one 

Top Performers

Week two 

Top Performers

Week three 

Top Performers

Week four 

Top Performers

Week five 

Top Performers

Week six 

Top Performers

Week seven 

Top Performers

Week eight

Top Performers

Week nine

Top Performers

Week ten

Top Performers

Week eleven 

Top Performers

Postseason

Weekly awards
Following each week of games, Lone Star conference officials select the players of the week from the conference's teams.

Postseason awards

All American

All-conference teams
Offense

Defense

Special Team

Honorable mention

Daktronics All-Super Region Team

First Team
Keidrick Jackson (RB) - MSU
Ken Van Heule (OL) - MSU
Manase Foketi (OL) - WT
Ethan Westbrooks (DL) - WT 
Rufus Johnson (DL) - TSU
Sergio Castillo, Jr. (PK) - WT

Second Team
Dustin Vaughan (QB) - WT 
Torrence Allen (WR) - WT 
Aaron Mullane (OL) - WT
Taylor McCuller (LB) - WT
Blake Barnes (PK) - TSU 
Devan Avery (CB - IW

Conferences awards

Defensive Player of the Year: Ethan Westbrooks (DL). WT
Freshman of the Year: Clayton Callicutt (DL), ASU 
Receiver of the year: Taylor Gabriel, ACU & Robert Armstrong, TAMUK 
Offensive Lineman of the Year: Ken Van Heule (0G), MSU
Defensive Lineman of the Year: Rufus Johnson (DE), TSU 
Linebacker of the Year: Danny Mason, TAMUC 
Defensive Back of the year: L.B. Suggs, ACU 
Coach of the year: Bill Maskill (MSU)  & Bo Atterberry (TAMUK)

Players going pro

Stats

Team

Scorring Offense 
Scorring Defense
Tottal Offense
Tottal Defense

Rushing Offense 

Rushing Defense
Pass Offense
Pass Defense
Pass Efficiency
Pass Defence Efficiency

Kickoff Returns

Punt Returns

Interceptions

Punting

Field Goals

Pat Kicking

Sacks by

Sacks against

First Downs
Opponents First Downs

Teams

Abilene Christian

Schedule

Angelo State

2012 Angelo State Rams football team

Eastern New Mexico

Schedule

Incarnate Word

2012 Incarnate Word Cardinals football team

Midwestern State

Schedule

Tarleton State

2012 Tarleton State Texans football team

Texas A&M–Commerce

Schedule

Texas A&M–Kingsville

2012 Texas A&M–Kingsville Javelinas football team

West Texas A&M

Schedule

References